is a Japanese physicist known for his work on CP-violation who was awarded one-fourth of the 2008 Nobel Prize in Physics "for the discovery of the origin of the broken symmetry which predicts the existence of at least three families of quarks in nature."

Early life and education 
Makoto Kobayashi was born in Nagoya, Japan in 1944. When he was two years old, Kobayashi's father Hisashi died. The Kobayashi family home was destroyed by the Bombing of Nagoya, so they stayed at his mother's (surnamed Kaifu) family house. One of Makoto's cousins, Toshiki Kaifu, the 51st Prime Minister of Japan, was living in the same place. His other cousin was an astronomer, Norio Kaifu. Many years later, Toshiki Kaifu recalled Kobayashi: "when he was a child, he was a quiet and lovely boy, always reading some difficult books in my room. I think this is the beginning of his sudden change into a genius."

After graduating from the School of Science of Nagoya University in 1967, he obtained a DSc degree from the Graduate School of Science of Nagoya University in 1972. During college years, he received guidance from Shoichi Sakata and others.

Career 

After completing his doctoral research at Nagoya University in 1972, Kobayashi worked as a research associate on particle physics at Kyoto University.  Together, with his colleague Toshihide Maskawa, he worked on explaining CP-violation within the Standard Model of particle physics.  Kobayashi and Maskawa's theory required that there were at least three generations of quarks, a prediction that was confirmed experimentally four years later by the discovery of the bottom quark.

Kobayashi and Maskawa's article, "CP Violation in the Renormalizable Theory of Weak Interaction", published in 1973, is the fourth most cited high energy physics paper of all time as of 2010. The Cabibbo–Kobayashi–Maskawa matrix, which defines the mixing parameters between quarks was the result of this work. Kobayashi and Maskawa were jointly awarded half of the 2008 Nobel Prize in Physics for this work, with the other half going to Yoichiro Nambu.

In recognition of three Nobel laureates' contributions, the bronze statues of Shin'ichirō Tomonaga, Leo Esaki, and Makoto Kobayashi was set up in the Central Park of Azuma 2 in Tsukuba City in 2015.

Professional record
April 1972 – Research Associate of the Faculty of Science, Kyoto University
July 1979 – Associate Professor of the National Laboratory of High Energy Physics (KEK)
April 1989 – Professor of the National Laboratory of High Energy Physics (KEK), Head of Physics Division II
April 1997 – Professor of the Institute of Particle and Nuclear Science, KEK, Head of Physics Division II
April 2003 – Director, Institute of Particle and Nuclear Studies, KEK
April 2004 – Trustee (Director, Institute of Particle and Nuclear Studies), KEK (Inter-University Research Institute Corporation)
June 2006 – Professor Emeritus of KEK
2008 – Distinguished Invited University Professor of Nagoya University
 2009
 Special Honored Professor of KEK
 Trustee and Director of Academic System Institute, Japan Society for the Promotion of Science
 University Professor of Nagoya University
 2010
 Chairperson of the Advisory Committee of the Kobayashi-Maskawa Institute for the Origin of Particles and the Universe (KMI) at Nagoya University
 Member of the Japan Academy
 2016 – Superadvisor of Yokohama Science Frontier High School 
 2018
 April – Director of the Kobayashi-Maskawa Institute for the Origin of Particles and the Universe (KMI) at Nagoya University
 2019 – Second Honorary Director of the Nagoya City Science Museum
 2020
 April – Director Emeritus of KMI at Nagoya University

Recognition
 1979 – Nishina Memorial Prize
 1985 – Sakurai Prize
 1995 – Asahi Prize
 2001 – Person of Cultural Merit
 2007 – High Energy and Particle Physics Prize by European Physical Society
 2008 – Nobel Prize in Physics
 In October 2008, Kobayashi was honored with Japan's Order of Culture; and an awards ceremony for the Order of Culture was held at the Tokyo Imperial Palace.
 2010 – Member of Japan Academy

Personal life
Kobayashi was born and educated in Nagoya, Japan.  He married Sachiko Enomoto in 1975; they had one son, Junichiro. After his first wife died, Kobayashi married Emiko Nakayama in 1990, they had a daughter, Yuka.

See also 

 Progress of Theoretical Physics
 List of Nobel laureates affiliated with Kyoto University
 List of Japanese Nobel laureates

References

External links

Progress of Theoretical Physics
Makoto Kobayashi, Professor emeritus of KEK
Kobayashi-Maskawa Institute for the Origin of Particles and the Universe (KMI), Nagoya University

Japanese physicists
Nobel laureates in Physics
Living people
1944 births
People from Nagoya
Japanese Nobel laureates
Recipients of the Order of Culture
Theoretical physicists
J. J. Sakurai Prize for Theoretical Particle Physics recipients
Particle physicists
Nagoya University alumni